The 2012–13 season are the Saba Football Club's 9th season in the Iran Pro League, and their 9th consecutive season in the top division of Iranian football. They are also competing in the Hazfi Cup and AFC Champions League, and 11th year in existence as a football club.

Club

Coaching staff

Golmohammadi's Coaching staff

Other personnel

Grounds

Kit 

|
|
|}

Player

Iran Pro League squad
As of 31 January 2013. Esteghlal F.C. Iran Pro League Squad 2011-12

AFC Champions League squad
As of 23 June 2013. Sabaye Qom F.C. Champions League Squad 2013

Transfers 
Confirmed transfers 2012–13

Summer 

In:

Out:

Winter 

In:

Out:

Competitions

Overview

Iran Pro League

Standings

Results summary

Results by round

Matches

AFC Champions League

Qualifying play-off

Hazfi Cup

Matches

Friendly Matches

Statistics

Squad, appearances and goals 

|-
! colspan="12" style="background:#dcdcdc; text-align:center"| Goalkeepers

|-
! colspan="12" style="background:#dcdcdc; text-align:center"| Defenders

|-
! colspan="12" style="background:#dcdcdc; text-align:center"| Midfielders

|-
! colspan="12" style="background:#dcdcdc; text-align:center"| Forwards

|}

Goals conceded 
 Updated on 21 May 2011

See also
 2012–13 Persian Gulf Cup
 2012–13 Hazfi Cup
 2013 AFC Champions League

References

External links
Iran Premier League Statistics
Persian League

2012-13
Iranian football clubs 2012–13 season